Rapping is a form of vocal delivery in music.

RAP or rap may refer to:

Computing and technology
 Rapid Refresh (weather prediction)
 Recognized air picture
 Remote Application Platform, open source software
 Rocket-assisted projectile
 Route Access Protocol, an Internet protocol, see List of TCP and UDP port numbers#Ranges
 Returned Account Procedure, a GSMA data record format

Healthcare
 Right atrial pressure, of the heart
 The Recognition and Prevention Program, of psychosis, Glen Oaks, New York, US

People
 H. Rap Brown, activist in the Black Power movement in the US
 H. Rap Brown Act, the Civil Rights Act of 1968
 Rap Reiplinger (1950-1984), Hawaiian comedian

Politics
 Rassemblement pour l'alternative progressiste, a political party in Quebec
 Rural Alliance Party, former Solomon Islands political party

Other uses

 Hip hop music or rap music, a musical genre
 RAP, the IATA airport code for Rapid City Regional Airport
 Rap (currency), the Romansh name for the sub-unit of the Swiss franc
 a counterfeit coin or something of negligible value, especially in Ireland
 AVV RAP, a former football club from Amsterdam
 RAP sheet (Record of Arrest and Prosecution sheet), a criminal record
 Rapper sword, a style of traditional sword-dancing from Northern England
 Reconciliation Action Plan, a business plan designed for organisations to improve relations with Indigenous peoples in Australia
 Regimental Aid Post, a frontline military establishment for triage on a battlefield 
 Registered Aboriginal Party in the state of Victoria, Australia
  Restricted Area Permit, required for non-Indian people to visit Protected and restricted areas of India
 Retirement annuity plan, a type of pension plan in the UK

See also
 Rapp (disambiguation)
 Wrap (disambiguation)